This article lists all rugby league footballers who have represented the New South Wales rugby league team in matches played since 1980 against Queensland under State of Origin selection criteria. Players are listed according to the date of their debut game. Tom Raudonikis is first as he was the first captain. Players cap numbers are those designated by the NSWRL.

List of players

Under-20s

Women's

See also

 List of Queensland State of Origin players

External links
Player's Register
True Blues
RLP List of Players

 
New South Wales rugby league team players